Rusty Schwimmer is an American character actress and singer. She has appeared in films such as A Little Princess (1995), Twister (1996), The Perfect Storm (2000), Runaway Jury (2003), North Country (2005), The Informant! (2009), and The Sessions (2012).

Early life
Schwimmer was raised in Chicago. She attended New Trier High School in suburban  Winnetka, with her best friend, actress Virginia Madsen.

Career
Schwimmer made her film debut in 1988, appearing in Memories of Me. She had small parts in Highlander II: The Quickening, Sleepwalkers and Candyman, before playing Joey B in Jason Goes to Hell: The Final Friday (1993). In 1995, she starred as Amelia Minchin in A Little Princess directed by Alfonso Cuarón. She went on to appear as Mrs. Thornton (Jo Harding's mother) in Twister (1996), Mrs Pendleton in Amistad (1997), Gridlock'd Gridlock'd (1997), Alice in EDtv (1999), Irene "Big Red" Johnson in The Perfect Storm (2000), Millie Dupree in Runaway Jury (2003), Big Betty in North Country  (2005), and as Aunt Martha in Perfect Sisters (2014) as well as office worker Peggy Displasia in The Belko Experiment in 2016. 

On television, Schwimmer had starring role in the 2006 Western miniseries Broken Trail playing "Big Rump" Kate Becker. From 2001 to 2003, she had a recurring role as Barbara Ludzinski on the CBS legal drama The Guardian. Schwimmer has also appeared in guest starring roles in several television series, including Parker Lewis Can't Lose, In the Heat of the Night, The Fresh Prince of Bel Air, Tales from the Crypt, Married... with Children, ER, Chicago Hope, Ally McBeal, Judging Amy, The X-Files, Gilmore Girls, CSI: Crime Scene Investigation, Criminal Minds, Heroes, Desperate Housewives, Boston Legal, Private Practice, Six Feet Under, Drop Dead Diva, Louie, Lucifer, Grey's Anatomy and Better Call Saul. She also appeared in The Guardians of the Galaxy Holiday Special.

Schwimmer also appeared in Paul Thomas Anderson’s teenage short film The Dirk Diggler Story, an early version of Boogie Nights.

References

External links

Actresses from Chicago
American film actresses
American television actresses
Living people
Year of birth missing (living people)
20th-century American actresses
21st-century American actresses
New Trier High School alumni